Racing stripes, also called Le Mans stripes or rally stripes, were originally applied to racecars to help identify them in the field during races. The term "racing stripe" is also used to refer to diagonal lines painted on watercraft hulls, usually on vessels belonging to a country's coast guard.

Racing cars 

Racing stripes were applied to the Cunningham team's racecars beginning in 1951. Usually two parallel blue stripes running from front to rear in the centre of the white body, they helped spectators identify the cars during races. These evolved from the traditional FIA-registered American racing colours of a white body and blue chassis, which dated from when racing cars had the chassis exposed.  The two blue stripes were a symbolic echo of the chassis colours.

In 1964, the Shelby Daytona Coupe would use the converse blue with white stripes and would compete in the 1964 and 1965 24 Hours of Le Mans.

Road cars and "go-faster stripes" 
The first road car to implement racing stripes was the 1965 Ford Mustang GT350. From the 1960s, stripes have sometimes been applied to road cars as well as racing cars. Such cars as the Renault 8 Gordini had stripes fitted as standard. They are sometimes referred to as "go-faster stripes" on road cars.

An alternative style features stripes which wrap around the car sideways instead of running down the center of the vehicle, called "bumblebee stripes". These stripes were featured prominently on the Dodge Charger Daytona racecar. Dodge's "Scat Pack" performance package for 1968-1971 muscle cars featured the bumblebee stripe as a signature.

In 1996, a pair of 8-inch wide stripes were used on the Dodge Viper GTS, starting a revival of the fashion. Since then, they have often been referred to as "Viper Stripes".

Use on watercraft
Many coast guard-type organizations have diagonally-slanted lines on their vessels' hulls, which are referred to as "racing stripes". An example is the service mark of the United States Coast Guard.

See also 
 Fin flash  
 List of international auto racing colours

References

External links 
Cover of Time magazine dated, April 26, 1954—the links at the bottom of the page lead to various years of production
A Costin Lister Jaguar raced by the Briggs Cunningham team in detail and with history—with link to views 
Full list of Team Cunningham drivers—presented on site along with many other informative pages
Road Racing Drivers Club—see deceased members list for the biography
 Briggs Swift Cunningham II—tribute 2003

Vehicle modifications
Automotive styling features